Tessaracoccus flavus is a Gram-positive, non-spore-forming and non-motile bacterium from the genus Tessaracoccus which has been isolated from a drainage system from a lindane-producing factory in Chinhat, India.

References

Propionibacteriales
Bacteria described in 2016